Stefan Schneider may refer to:

Stefan Schneider (athlete),  Swiss track and field athlete
Stefan Schneider (director), director of documentary Super Comet: After the Impact
Stefan Schneider, fictional character in the Dead Space: Salvage comic book
Stefan Schneider (figure skating), Canadian figure skater who competed at the 2008 Canadian Figure Skating Championships
Stefan Schneider (ice hockey born 1975), Swiss ice hockey defenceman 
Stefan Schneider (ice hockey born 1989), Canadian ice hockey player
Stefan Schneider (musician), member of To Rococo Rot